Libon may refer to:

Libon (architect), an ancient Greek architect
Libon (Bithynia), a town of ancient Bithynia
Libon (service), a VoIP and instant messaging application for smartphones
Libon, Albay, Philippines
A village in the Logo Anseba district of Eritrea

See also
:fr:Libon, Ivan Terlecki (1972), French cartoonist